Bangangté is a town and commune in Cameroon. It is the capital of the Ndé division of West Region.  The town is primarily inhabited by the people of the Bamileke (Bamiléké) tribe.

It is home to the Université des Montagnes, a small private university focusing on health and technology programs.

Transportation 

Bus agencies to and from main cities in Cameroon such as Bafoussam, Douala and Yaoundé have buses that leave several times per day.

Market 

There are two main markets in Bangangté: Marché A and B.  Marché A is located in the center of the town and is open seven days a week and sells a variety of fresh produce, clothing, basic hardware supplies and electronics.

Marché B is located in a neighborhood south of the town center and is open Wednesdays and Saturdays.  It generally has the same types of goods as Marché A, but many more vendors so prices may be lower.

Traditional Society 

The dominant tribal group is the Bamileke people. The traditional society is ruled by a tribal chief or king.

See also
Communes of Cameroon

Populated places in West Region (Cameroon)
Communes of Cameroon